WYBZ (107.3 FM) is a radio station broadcasting a classic hits music radio format, and is known on-air as "Y107.3". WYBZ is licensed to Crooksville, Ohio, and like many stations in the region, targets listeners in the nearby Zanesville, Ohio area including the following counties: Muskingum, Perry, Licking, Morgan and Coshocton.

History
WYBZ Radio was founded on October 1, 1990 in Zanesville, Ohio. The call letters were created based on the famous Y Bridge located in Zanesville. The station plays classic hits from artist like Queen, Aerosmith, David Bowie, Michael Jackson, Prince, Elton John, Journey, and more. The station's tagline is "Live and Local" and is proud to serve Zanesville and the surrounding communities.

References

External links
WYBZ "Y-107.3" Official website

YBZ
Classic hits radio stations in the United States